West Mountain is a census-designated place (CDP) in the town of Ridgefield, Fairfield County, Connecticut, United States. It is on the west side of Ridgefield and is bordered to the west by the towns of North Salem and Lewisboro in Westchester County, New York. The West Mountain Historic District occupies  at the center of the CDP, and newer residences occupy portions of the remainder of the CDP.

West Mountain was first listed as a CDP prior to the 2020 census.

References 

Census-designated places in Fairfield County, Connecticut
Census-designated places in Connecticut